FAP Captain David Abensur Rengifo International Airport  (also known as Captain Rolden International Airport) is an airport serving the city of Pucallpa in the Ucayali Region of Peru. It is operated by Aeropuertos del Perú, S.A. Captain Rengifo Airport is the main airport serving the Ucayali Region.

Airlines and destinations 

AirMajoro provide charter flights to amazon towns in Peru.

Incidents and accidents 

On 23 August 2005, TANS Perú Flight 204, a Boeing 737, crashed short of the runway at Pucallpa Airport. Out of the 98 passengers and crew on board, 40 were killed.

See also
Transport in Peru
List of airports in Peru

References

External links 
CORPAC official site (Spanish only)
SkyVector Aeronautical Charts
OurAirports - Pucallpa

Airports in Peru
Buildings and structures in Ucayali Region